Delvim Fabiola Bárcenas Nieves (born 16 January 1977) is a Mexican politician and lawyer affiliated with the PRI. She currently serves as Deputy of the LXII Legislature of the Mexican Congress representing Querétaro.

References

1977 births
Living people
People from Querétaro
Women members of the Chamber of Deputies (Mexico)
21st-century Mexican lawyers
Institutional Revolutionary Party politicians
Mexican women lawyers
21st-century Mexican politicians
21st-century Mexican women politicians
Deputies of the LXII Legislature of Mexico
Members of the Chamber of Deputies (Mexico) for Querétaro